A Locomotive is a railway vehicle that provides the motive power for a train. 
A road locomotive is a type of heavy-haulage traction engine.

"Locomotive" may also refer to:

In music
Locomotive (band), a 1960s British band
Locomotive Music, an independent record label based in Spain
"Locomotive", a song from the 1991 Guns N' Roses album Use Your Illusion II
"Locomotive", a song by :nl:Meike Touw's Tutti Frutti	1980
"Locomotive", a song by Rancid (band)	2012
"Locomotive", a song by Thelonious Monk Quintet 	1957
"Locomotive Breath", a song from the 1971 Jethro Tull album Aqualung

Other uses
The Czech Locomotive, nickname for Emil Zátopek, the only man to win the 5,000 and 10,000 meters as well as the marathon at a single Olympic tournament
Locomotive (book), a 2013 children's book by Brian Floca
Locomotive Software, a British software house supplying products for Amstrad's home and small business computers of the 1980s
Las Vegas Locomotives, a 2009-2012 American football team
Locomotive Mountain, in Canada

See also
 Lokomotiv, the name of a number of Cold War and post Cold War sports teams
 Lokomotiv (band), a Southern California band